Internationalist Initiative–Solidarity among Peoples (II–SP) (Spanish: Iniciativa Internacionalista–La Solidaridad entre los Pueblos, Basque: Iniziatiba Internazionalista - Herrien Elkartasuna, Catalan: Iniciativa Internacionalista – La Solidaritat entre els Pobles, Galician: Iniciativa Internacionalista – A Solidariedade entre os Pobos) was an extreme left  political coalition from Spain.

Composition

History
It was banned by the Supreme Court 2009 May, after press reports linked some of its candidates with those of the banned Basque separatist party Batasuna. Days later, on 22 May, the Constitutional Court cancelled the previous decision. The list failed to win any seat in the elections.
The goals of the candidature were social justice, full democratic liberties, opposition to discrimination by reason of gender, and the right of self-determination of some of Spain's nationalities. The head of the European Parliament elections list was Alfonso Sastre, a well-known Spanish language playwright. The second candidate on the list is IzCa leader Doris Benegas Haddad and, at number 10, is Alicia Hermida, a well-known Spanish actress. After the failure in the elections, II disappeared.

Electoral performance

European Parliament

References

External links
Iniciativa Internacionalista

2009 disestablishments in Spain
2009 establishments in Spain
Defunct communist parties in Spain
Defunct nationalist parties in Spain
Defunct political party alliances in Spain
Far-left politics in Spain
Formerly banned communist parties
Formerly banned political parties in Spain
Left-wing nationalist parties
Political parties disestablished in 2009
Political parties established in 2009